The 1964–65 Michigan Wolverines men's basketball team represented the University of Michigan in intercollegiate college basketball during the 1964–65 season. The team played its home games at Fielding H. Yost Field House (renamed Yost Ice Arena in 1973) on the school's campus in Ann Arbor, Michigan. Under the direction of head coach Dave Strack, the team won the Big Ten Conference Championship.

Season review
This was the second of three consecutive Big Ten titles and Michigan's second visit to the NCAA Division I men's basketball tournament final four. The team earned the Big Ten team statistical championships for both scoring offense (92.9) and scoring margin (12.2). Junior Cazzie Russell averaged 25.7 points per game and senior Bill Buntin added 20.1. The team spent the entire 15-week season ranked in the Associated Press Top Ten Poll, starting and ending the season ranked number one and holding that position in ten of the fifteen weeks of the poll.  The team also finished the season ranked number one in the final UPI Coaches' Poll. Larry Tregoning served as team captain, while Russell and Buntin shared team MVP.

The team was the first Michigan team to defeat the number one ranked team in the country when it beat Wichita State on December 14 by an 87–85 margin.  only two Michigan teams have done so. On March 20, 1965, Oliver Darden went 11 for 11 in free throw attempts against UCLA, which was a school single-game record for most without a miss until Craig Dill made 12 on February 18, 1966.

Postseason
In the 23-team 1965 NCAA Division I men's basketball tournament, Michigan improved upon its 1964 tournament final four appearance by reaching the national championship game against the UCLA Bruins where they were upset, 91–80. As it had the year before the team had an opening round bye. Then it defeated the  98–71 and the  87–85 to win the Mideast region. In the Final Four, Michigan defeated the Bill Bradley-led Princeton Tigers team 93–76, before they were upset by UCLA in the National Championship game. In the championship game, Michigan had three players disqualified, which was an NCAA tournament championship game record that stood until March 31, 1997. The season marked John Wooden's second consecutive championship as UCLA coach and the second of what would become nine championships in ten seasons.

NCAA tournament summary
Mideast
Michigan 98, Dayton 71
 Michigan 87, Vanderbilt 85
Final Four
 Michigan 93, Princeton 76
 UCLA 91, Michigan 80

Accomplishments
Various members of the team earned significant recognitions: Strack earned the UPI College Basketball Coach of the Year.  Russell won the Chicago Tribune Silver Basketball as Big Ten MVP. Russell and Buntin were both 1965 NCAA Men's Basketball All-Americans.  Following the season Bill Buntin became the first Wolverine selected in the NBA Draft.

That season, Buntin surpassed John Tidwell and established the Michigan career scoring record with 1725 and a 21.8 average, but Russell would end his career the following year with superior numbers. Russell eclipsed his own single-season point total record of 670 with a total of 694 ( a number he would surpass the following season). Buntin also surpassed, M. C. Burton, Jr.'s 1957–59 career rebound total of 831 and average of 12.59 with 1037 and 13.13, but Rudy Tomjanovich would set the current standards by surpassing both of these in 1970. However, Buntin's total of 58 career point-rebound double doubles remains a Michigan record. While Russell eclipsed Buntin's single-season school free throw record of 151 by one, Buntin set the school's career total record of 385, but both of these marks would be eclipsed by Russell the following season. The team continues to hold the single-season Big Ten Conference rebounding record with 1521, a total that was tied by the national champion 2000 Michigan State Spartans The team set the single-season team points per game Big Ten Conference record with 92.9 (1,300 in 14 conference games).  The record would be broken the following season by the Wolverines. The team set the school single-season free throws made record of 494, which would last until 1977. On December 1, 1964, the team began a 17-game home winning streak against the  that continued through a January 29, 1966, victory over Wisconsin. This surpassed the 16-game streak from February 22, 1947 – February 7, 1949, and stood as the longest home winning streak in school history until a 22-game streak that started on January 12, 1976.

Statistics
The team posted the following statistics:

Rankings

Team players drafted into the NBA
Five players from this team were selected in the NBA Draft.

See also
 NCAA Men's Division I Final Four appearances by coaches
 NCAA Men's Division I Final Four appearances by school
 List of the NCAA Division I men's basketball tournament Final Four participants
 NCAA Men's Division I Tournament bids by school
 NCAA Men's Division I Tournament bids by school and conference
 NCAA Division I men's basketball tournament all-time team records

References

Michigan
Michigan Wolverines men's basketball seasons
NCAA Division I men's basketball tournament Final Four seasons
Michigan
Michigan Wolverines basketball
Michigan Wolverines basketball